Stefan Pot (born 15 July 1994) is a Serbian professional basketball player for Falco KC Szombathely of the Hungarian League.

Playing career 
Pot has started his professional career at Spartak Subotica, from which he moved to Novi Sad and afterwards to CSU Asesoft Ploiești in Romania. After that he returned to Serbia, where he appeared for Metalac and Mladost Zemun. The peak of his career came in the 2016–17 ABA season, when he signed with Partizan NIS and after that season he spent three seasons with FMP.

In August 2020, Pot signed for the Bosnian ABA team Igokea. He averaged 8.0 points, 3.3 assists and 2.3 rebounds per game. 

On September 25, 2021, Pot signed with Kolossos Rodou of the Greek Basket League, replacing Ty Lawson. In 26 games, he averaged 8 points, 3.7 rebounds, 4.7 assists and 0.6 steals, playing around 24 minutes per contest.

References

1994 births
Living people
ABA League players
Basketball League of Serbia players
Bosnia and Herzegovina expatriate basketball people in Greece
Bosnia and Herzegovina expatriate basketball people in Serbia
CSU Asesoft Ploiești players
Falco KC Szombathely players
KK Mladost Zemun players
KK Novi Sad players
KK Igokea players
KK Partizan players
KK Spartak Subotica players
KK Vojvodina Srbijagas players
Kolossos Rodou B.C. players
People from Bijeljina
Point guards
Serbian expatriate basketball people in Bosnia and Herzegovina
Serbian expatriate basketball people in Greece
Serbian expatriate basketball people in Hungary
Serbian expatriate basketball people in Romania
Serbian men's basketball players
Serbs of Bosnia and Herzegovina